This is a list of supermarket chains in Russia.

Supermarkets 
Auchan
Azbuka Vkusa ( — Alphabet of Taste)
Dixy
Lenta ( — Belt) -419 supermarket, 255 hupermarket 
Magnit ( - 7,416 stores) 25315 all markets.
METRO
O'Key Group
Da! - 82 discounter stores
Perekrestok ( — Crossroads)
Pyaterochka
SPAR
Svetofor

Specialty chains

Jewellery retailers

References

 
Supermarkets
Russia